Macroglossum semifasciata, the half-banded hummingbird hawkmoth, is a moth of the family Sphingidae. It is known from north-eastern India, Myanmar, Thailand, south-western China, Vietnam, Malaysia (Peninsular, Sarawak) and Indonesia (Sumatra, Java, Kalimantan).

References

Macroglossum
Moths described in 1893
Moths of Asia